The Achilixiidae are a family of Fulgoromorpha (planthoppers); species may be found in the neotropical and Asian regions.

Genera and species
Two genera, each in its own subfamily, are known:

Achilixiinae
Auth.: Muir, 1923 - Malesia
 Achilixius Muir, 1923
 Achilixius bakeri Wilson, 1989
 Achilixius danaumoati Wilson, 1989
 Achilixius davaoensi Muir, 1923
 Achilixius fasciata Wilson, 1989
 Achilixius fennahi Wilson, 1989
 Achilixius irigae Wilson, 1989
 Achilixius kolintangi Wilson, 1989
 Achilixius mayoyae Wilson, 1989
 Achilixius minahassae Wilson, 1989
 Achilixius morowali Wilson, 1989
 Achilixius muajati Wilson, 1989
 Achilixius muiri Wilson, 1989
 Achilixius sandakanensis Muir, 1923
 Achilixius singularis Muir, 1923 - type species
 Achilixius torautensis Wilson, 1989
 Achilixius tubulifer (Melichar, 1914)  (synonym Syntames tubulifer Melichar, 1914)

Bebaiotinae
Auth.: Emeljanov, 1991 - neotropical region
 Bebaiotes Muir, 1924
 Bebaiotes banksi (Metcalf, 1938) (synonym Muirilixius banksi Metcalf, 1938)
 Bebaiotes bucayensis Muir, 1924 – type species
 Bebaiotes dorsivittata Fennah, 1947
 Bebaiotes guianesus (Fennah, 1947) (synonym Muirilixius guianesus Fennah, 1947)
 Bebaiotes nigrigaster Muir, 1924
 Bebaiotes nivosa Fennah, 1947
 Bebaiotes pallidinervis Muir, 1934
 Bebaiotes pulla Muir, 1934

References

External links

Auchenorrhyncha families
Hemiptera of Asia
Hemiptera of South America